William P. Costas (June 18, 1927 – July 23, 2013) was an American businessman and politician.

Born in Detroit, Michigan, he started his business career as a food buyer in Gary, Indiana. He then owned and operated Costas Foods in Valparaiso, Indiana 1972–1998. He served in the Indiana State Senate 1980–1988. His son Jon Costas is mayor of Valparaiso, Indiana. Costas died in Valparaiso, Indiana.

Notes

1927 births
2013 deaths
Politicians from Detroit
Politicians from Gary, Indiana
People from Valparaiso, Indiana
Businesspeople from Indiana
Indiana state senators
20th-century American businesspeople